Bolsherechye is an urban locality (a work settlement) and the administrative center of Bolsherechensky District of Omsk Oblast, Russia, located  northeast of Omsk along the Irtysh River. Population:

History
The Bolsheretsky fortress was founded on the Irtysh as a barrier for defense from invasions in 1627. Bolsherechye is located about half-way between Omsk and Tara and is a convenient stopping point for many automobile and river travelers, including those on package tours of the region.

Zoo
Bolsherechye is best known for its zoo, opened in 1983. Bolsherechye Zoo is naturally stretched out through  and is much more impressive than its hometown size suggests. The only resident zoo in the region, it has daringly but successfully withstood the political, financial, and climatic challenges of the turbulent post-Soviet period. The zoo opens a seasonal branch exhibit in the otherwise dominant Omsk, which to this day has only a small zoological youth station.

Notable residents 

Leonid Yachmenyov (1938–2021), basketball coach

References

Urban-type settlements in Omsk Oblast
Tarsky Uyezd